Mark Engebretson, DMA, Northwestern University (born 1964, California) is a saxophonist and composer.  His music combines computer music and live performance, the latter usually performed on saxophone.

Biography
Engebretson was born in California and raised in Alexandria, Minnesota.  His family later moved to North St. Paul, Minnesota.   His father, a retired doctor, is also a saxophonist as well as a clarinettist.  Engbretson attended St. Olaf College for a year before transferring to the University of Minnesota.  He is currently Associate Professor of Composition and Electronic Music at the University of North Carolina at Greensboro and director of the Alice Virginia Poe Williams Electronic Music Studio at that university. He is a member of Red Clay Saxophone Quartet and was formerly a member of the Vienna Saxophone Quartet. Aside from Northwestern University, he also studied at the University of Minnesota and the Conservatoire de Bordeaux.  His teachers have included Frederick Hemke, Jean-Marie Londeix, M. William Karlins, Pauline Oliveros, Marta Ptaszynska, Michael Pisaro and Jay Alan Yim.

Music
As a composer his influences include Eugène Bozza and Paule Maurice.  Eric Stokes introduced him to experimental music and found sound (i.e. Found art using sounds as its material).  Engebretson has received commissions from Harvard University's Fromm Music Foundation (2007) and  the Thomas S. Kenan Center for the Arts (2008).  His compositions have been performed at Indiana State University New Music Festival (Terre Haute, Indiana) and International Society for Contemporary Music Festivals (Tirana, Albania and Baku, Azerbaijan) as well as several lesser known contemporary music festivals such as Wien Modern (Vienna), Gaida Festival (Vilnius, Lithuania), Ny Musikk (Bergen, Norway) and the Florida Electroacoustic Music Festival.  The world premiere of SaxMax was given at the 14th World Saxophone Congress in Ljubljana, Slovenia by James Romain.

References

External links
 
 
 Publisher Effiny Music
 Publisher Apoll Edition, Vienna
 Mark Engebretson member page on Society of Composers
 Faculty Profile University of North Carolina at Greensboro, School of Music
 Profile on Hartwick College Music Festival website
 Innova Records listing for recordings on Innova label'
 Profile on World Saxophone Congress website
 Red Clay Saxophone Quartet - Mark Engebretson profile on Steve Stusek personal website
 Programme notes with biography and profile for the North American Saxophone Alliance 2004 biennial conference

21st-century classical composers
American male classical composers
American classical composers
University of Minnesota alumni
American classical saxophonists
American male saxophonists
Living people
People from Douglas County, Minnesota
1964 births
Conservatoire de Bordeaux alumni
21st-century American composers
21st-century American saxophonists
21st-century American male musicians